The 1980 CART PPG Indy Car World Series season was the second in the CART era of U.S. open-wheel racing. It consisted of twelve races, beginning in Ontario, California on April 13 and concluding in Avondale, Arizona on November 8.  The PPG Indy Car World Series Drivers' Champion and Indianapolis 500 winner was Johnny Rutherford.  Rookie of the Year was Dennis Firestone.  The entire season, including the 64th Indianapolis 500, was to be co-sanctioned by both the USAC and CART under the banner of the Championship Racing League (CRL). However, USAC withdrew from the arrangement after five races.

The season-opening race at Phoenix, set for March 2, was cancelled due to local flooding and washed out roads.

Johnny Rutherford in Jim Hall's Chaparral 2K ground effects chassis dominated the season. Rutherford won five races, including a dominating performance at the 1980 Indianapolis 500. Rutherford finished in the top five in the first ten races, pulling out to a commanding and unmatchable points lead. Rutherford started the season out by finishing 1st or 2nd in the first six races, and ended with a total of eight finished of 1st or 2nd. Rutherford's season was not without incident, however. In the final race of the season at Phoenix, while battling Tom Sneva for the lead, Rutherford tangled with a lapped car, hit the wall, then flipped over. The car landed upside-down hard on its rollbar, but Rutherford was not seriously injured.

Drivers and constructors 
The following teams and drivers competed for the 1980 CART World Series.

Notable team and driver changes 

 After racing only at Indy in 1979, Leader Card Racing moves from USAC to CART, with Sheldon Kinser as lead driver and Bill Vukovich II running a limited schedule.
 AMI Racing also moves from USAC to CART, with Gary Bettenhausen as the driver. 
 Team McLaren shuts down their IndyCar operations. Driver Johnny Rutherford moves to Chaparral Cars, replacing Al Unser.
 With Al Unser out at Chaparral, he moves to Longhorn Racing, replacing Tom Bagley.
 Vollstedt Enterprises, which only ran Indy the previous year, moves to a full schedule, driven by Dick Simon.
 Rookie driver Bill Tempero debuts with owner-driver team Tempero Racing.
 Wally Dallenbach Sr. retired from CART at the end of the 1979 season, becoming its competition director. His ride at Patrick Racing is filled by Tom Bagley.
 John Menard Jr. forms the new Team Menard organization, with Herm Johnson as the driver.
 Jerry Karl moves from USAC to CART, with his owner-driver team Karl Racing.
 Alsup Racing expands to a two-car team, with Bill Alsup joined in most races by Phil Caliva.
 After running a full season in 1979, All American Racers and driver Mike Mosley only run three races in 1980.
 Hoffman Racing once again fields a variety of drivers, with Lee Kunzman, Joe Saldana, and Bob Frey splitting the year.
 Roger Rager moves he and his owner-driver Rager Racing from USAC to CART.
 After competing in most of the 1979 races, Salt Walther and team Walmotor only race in 2 races.
 Larry Cannon and his Cannon Racing team move to a full-time schedule after running part-time in 1979.
 Gehlhausen Racing, which fielded a full-time team in 1979, closes, with driver Spike Gehlhausen moving to Bob Fletcher Racing.

Notable equipment changes 

 Longhorn Racing switches from a Penske chassis to its own Longhorn.
 Morales Motorsports switches from a Lightning chassis to a used Penske. 
 Patrick Racing switches from a Penske to Phoenix chassis.
 Bob Fletcher Racing switches from a Lightning to Penske chassis.
 Alsup Racing switches from a McLaren to Penske chassis and from an Offenhauser to Cosworth engine.

Season Summary

Schedule 

- The Phoenix race was scheduled for March 2, but cancelled due to flooding.
 Oval/Speedway  Dedicated road course

Race summaries 
Race 1: Datsun Twin 200

For the opening race of the year, Johnny Rutherford qualified on the pole, with Bobby Unser, Al Unser, Rick Mears, and Tom Sneva making up the rest of the top five starters.

Johnny Rutherford led the first eight laps, before Bobby Unser caught and passed in lap traffic.  However, while leading on lap 14, he suffered a cracked radiator and dropped out. This moved Rutherford back in front, and he was mostly uncontested for the remainder of the race as most challengers had problems. Rick Mears dropped out due to electrical issues while running second. Pancho Carter moved up to second, but he dropped out with fuel pump problems, followed by Al Unser dropping out on lap 45 with a broken transmission. With most of his competition out, Rutherford cruised to an easy victory over Tom Sneva. Gordon Johncock finished third, Spike Gehlhausen fourth, and Tom Bagley fifth.

Race 2: Indianapolis 500

Race 3: Rex Mays Classic

Gordon Johncock qualified on the pole, with Johnny Rutherford starting second, Al Unser starting third, Rick Mears starting fourth, and Bobby Unser rounding out the top five starters.

In the race Rutherford jumped out to the lead on lap 7, and controlled most of the next 50 laps before Gordon Johncock took the lead on lap 55. 60 laps later, under the fourth caution of the day, Al Unser, who was running in second had an engine failure and dropped out. This moved his brother Bobby Unser into second, and on the restart he managed to catch and pass Johncock for the lead, holding on to win. Johnny Rutherford rose to second, Gordon Johncock ended up third, Pancho Carter finished fourth, and Rick Mears fifth.

With his second place, Rutherford now had a 400 point lead over second place Tom Sneva, with Gordon Johncock 550 points back in third, Gary Bettenhausen 925 points back in fourth, and Rick Mears 984 points behind in fifth.

Race 4: True Value 500

Bobby Unser won the pole, with A.J. Foyt starting second, Mario Andretti starting third, Mike Mosley starting in fourth, and Johnny Rutherford starting fifth.

In the race, A.J. Foyt took the lead on the first lap, and led most of the first half of the race, giving up the lead only for pit shuffling. The first caution came on lap 11, when Al Loquasto lost a wheel and Dennis Firestone wrecked in the same part of the track. The second caution came on lap 26, after Howdy Holmes lost control, Jim McElreath slowed and Roger Rager hit the rear of his car.

While leading on lap 82, Foyt encountered a bad valve, and dropped out. This gave the lead to Bobby Unser, who led most of the rest of the race. Johnny Rutherford led 1 lap due to pit stop shuffling, followed by 5 laps under caution after Pancho Carter spun, but when the green flag flew after a caution on lap 165, Unser pulled away. Rutherford's hopes of winning ended with 20 laps to go when his engine stalled in the pits, allowing Unser to win the race by a wide margin over Rutherford. Tom Sneva finished third, Bill Alsup fourth, and Vern Schuppan fifth. Most other stars were taken out due to attrition. Al Unser was never a factor and dropped out with handling problems on lap 35. Mike Mosley broke a piston while running in third on lap 46, Danny Ongais dropped out with clutch problems on lap 100, Mario Andretti was sidelined with a broken transmission on lap 105, and Rick Mears blew his engine on lap 163.

Johnny Rutherford extended his lead to 500 points over Tom Sneva, with Bobby Unser rising to third, 1114 points behind, Gordon Johncock, who didn't enter, falling to fourth, 1350 points back, and Pancho Carter rising to fifth, 1452 points behind.

Race 5: Red Roof Inns 250

Al Unser qualified on the pole, followed by brother Bobby Unser in second, Rick Mears in third, Johnny Rutherford in fourth, and Danny Ongais rounding out the top five starters.

The start of the race was problematic. Starter Duane Sweeney didn't give the green flag when the pace car pulled off as the back rows were strung out, but the field got going anyway, with Al Unser spinning off track in the first turn. Two laps later they got back in two-by-two order for the official start.  Danny Ongais and Sheldon Kinser didn't make it to the green flag, with Ongais having ignition problems and Kinser a blown engine. On the first lap, Tim Richmond spun off course and was hit by John Wood.

Bobby Unser jumped out to the lead after his brother spun, and led the first 12 laps, But he encountered a valve problem while leading and dropped out. Rick Mears then took the lead, and throughout the next 20 laps dueled with Johnny Rutherford. After a poor pit stop by Rutherford, Mears had a 20 second lead, but due to heat exhaustion lost concentration and spun out while leading on lap 47. This gave the lead to Rutherford, with Mears's day ending on lap 54 after Rick Muther spun out and Mears hit him. This brought out the caution, allowing second place Gordon Johncock to close. But when the green flew, Rutherford pulled away and won, a rare road course win. Bill Alsup finished third, Roger Mears fourth, and Vern Schuppan fifth. Polesitter Al Unser lost a lap due to an unscheduled pit stop, and dropped out with suspension problems while running fifth.

Rutherford now had a 770 point lead over Tom Sneva, who had crashed out. Bobby Unser was third, 1406 points back, Gordon Johncock fourth, 1410 points back, and Pancho Carter fifth, 1662 points back.

Race Results

 CART and USAC united in 1980 under the banner of the Championship Racing League (CRL).The first five races of the season were run under CRL banner sanction by USAC. The union dissolved after the Mid-Ohio race. CART sanctioned the seven remaining races on the schedule and combined the results of those along with the CRL events for their championship.

Final driver standings

Driver Breakdown

See also
 1980 Indianapolis 500
 1980 USAC Championship Car season

References
 
 
 

Champ Car seasons
IndyCar
 
IndyCar